Julie Ferrier (born 5 December 1971) is a French actress, comedian, dancer, writer and theater director.

Early life
Ferrier is in the eighth generation of actresses on the maternal side of her family. She was raised in a difficult housing project in the Seine-Saint-Denis town of Noisy Le Grand.  In 1988, she entered the Conservatoire de Paris, then attended the circus school Académie Fratellini.  She was first interested in dance, in which field she worked professionally for ten years, for choreographers such as Philippe Decouflé – she danced at the opening ceremony of the 1992 Winter Olympics at Albertville – and was a colleague of Kamel Ouali.

From 1996 to 1998 she took classes at L'École Internationale de Théâtre Jacques Lecoq, directed by Alain Mollot.

Career
In 2001, she was in the Théâtre de la Jacquerie directed by Alain Mollot.

In 2004, she played Today is Ferrier in a mise en scène by Isabelle Nanty.

In 2006, her one-woman show Today is Ferrier was a public and critical success.

In 2007 she voiced the television animation Moot-Moot and put out the DVD of Today is Ferrier.

In 2008 she was the leading actress in Mademoiselle broadcast on France 2.  This was the French adaptation of the German series Ladykracher based on absurd situations in the daily lives of women.  She has also been on the posters of eight films.

In 2009 she was on the jury for the festival of short fantasy films Fantastic'Arts.

Filmography

Theatre

References

External links

Les Archives du Spectacle

1971 births
Living people
French stage actresses
French film actresses
French television actresses
People from Saint-Denis, Seine-Saint-Denis
21st-century French actresses